The 1963 Soviet football championship was the 31st seasons of competitive football in the Soviet Union and the 25th among teams of sports societies and factories. Dinamo won the championship becoming the Soviet domestic champions for the tenth time.

Honours

Notes = Number in parentheses is the times that club has won that honour. * indicates new record for competition

Soviet Union football championship

Class A First Group

Class A Second Group

Class B

Russian Federation finals

Ukraine (playoffs)
Each team played against the same ranking team from the other zone. Only the two top pairs that really mattered concerning promotion are listed next. No teams were relegated. SKA Odessa obtained the promotion from the Ukraine zone. They were classified as the Republican champions and were promoted to the Inter-Republican level, the Class A.

 FC Lokomotiv Vinnitsa - SKA Odessa 0:2 0:1
 FC Azovstal Zhdanov - SKA Lvov 0:0 1:0
 FC Zirka Kirovograd - FC Torpedo Kharkov 1:1 0:2
 FC Burevestnik Melitopol - FC Polesie Zhitomir 1:0 1:3
 FC Avangard Ternopol - FC Shakhter Gorlovka 1:1 0:0
 FC Kolgospnik Cherkassy - FC Khimik Severodonetsk 2:1 0:2
 FC Lokomotiv Donetsk - SKA Kiev 0:2 1:2
 FC Stroitel Kherson - FC Shakhter Kadeevka 3:2 0:2
 FC Dynamo Khmelnitskiy - FC Kolgospnik Poltava 5:1 0:1
 FC Arsenal Kiev - FC Dneprovets Dneprodzerzhinsk 3:2 1:2
 FC Desna Chernigov - FC Metallurg Kommunarsk 3:1 1:2
 SCF Sevastopol - FC Spartak Ivano-Frankovsk 2:1 1:4
 FC Verkhovina Uzhgorod - FC Trubnik Nikopol 0:0 1:2
 FC Avangard Zheltye Vody - FC Sudostroitel Nikolaev 1:1 1:0
 FC Avangard Chernovtsy - SC Tavriya Simferopol 6:0 0:1
 FC Avangard Kramatorsk - FC Shakhter Aleksandriya 1:1 0:2
 FC Volyn Lutsk - FC Gornyak Krivoy Rog 0:0 0:3
 FC Kolgospnik Rovno - FC Metallurg Yenakievo 3:1 2:2
 FC Metallurg Kerch - FC Neftyanik Drogobich 0:1 0:0
 FC Dnepr Kremenchug - FC Spartak Sumy 0:0 0:2

Union republics finals
 Dinamo Batumi  0-1 1-5  Lokomotiv Tbilisi

Top goalscorers

Class A First Group
Oleg Kopayev (SKA Rostov-na-Donu) – 27 goals

Class A Second Group
Anatoliy Isayev (Shinnik Yaroslavl), Viktor Korolkov (Shakhter Karaganda) – 13 goals

References

External links
 1963 Soviet football championship. RSSSF